Paramontana punicea is a species of sea snail, a marine gastropod mollusk in the family Raphitomidae.

This species has also been considered a synonym of Pseudodaphnella pullula Hervier, R.P.J., 1897

Description
The length of the shell attains 5.5 mm, its diameter 2.5 mm.

(Original description) The small, solid shell is ovate-lanceolate and acuminate. The shell contains 7 whorls, including a two-whorled protoconch. Its colour is uniform lilac. 

Sculpture: Stout perpendicular ribs extending from the shoulder to the base are set at thirteen to a whorl, about their own breadth apart. The spirals number three or four on the upper whorls, and nine on the body whorl. A bead occurs where a spiral intersects a rib, and on the snout, where the radials do not otherwise appear, the small close spirals are still beaded. The aperture is wide. The varix is massive There are four denticules within the outer lip.

Distribution
This marine species occurs off New Caledonia and Australia (Queensland).

References

 Powell, A.W.B. 1966. The molluscan families Speightiidae and Turridae, an evaluation of the valid taxa, both Recent and fossil, with list of characteristic species. Bulletin of the Auckland Institute and Museum. Auckland, New Zealand 5: 1–184, pls 1–23

External links
 

punicea
Gastropods described in 1922
Gastropods of Australia